The 1920 Brooklyn Robins, also known as the Dodgers, won 16 of their final 18 games to pull away from a tight pennant race and earn a trip to their second World Series against the Cleveland Indians. They lost the series in seven games.

The team featured four Hall of Famers: manager Wilbert Robinson, pitchers Burleigh Grimes and Rube Marquard, and outfielder Zack Wheat. Grimes anchored a pitching staff that allowed the fewest runs in the majors.

Offseason 
 January 1920: Frank O'Rourke was purchased from the Robins by the Washington Senators.
 January 12, 1920: Mack Wheat was purchased from the Robins by the Philadelphia Phillies.
 March 1920: Bill Lamar was purchased by the Robins from the Boston Red Sox.

Regular season 
On May 1, Brooklyn and the Boston Braves played what remains the longest major league baseball game, tied 1 to 1 at the end of nine innings and then going scoreless for 17 more until the game 26-inning game was called because of darkness

Season standings

Record vs. opponents

Notable transactions 
 May 22, 1920: Bill McCabe was purchased by the Robins from the Chicago Cubs.
 July 1920: Wally Hood was purchased from the Robins by the Pittsburgh Pirates.
 July 27, 1920: Doug Baird was purchased from the Robins by the New York Giants.

Roster

Player stats

Batting

Starters by position 
Note: Pos = Position; G = Games played; AB = At bats; R = Runs; H = Hits; Avg. = Batting average; HR = Home runs; RBI = Runs batted in; SB = Stolen bases

Other batters 
Note: G = Games played; AB = At bats; R = Runs; H = Hits; Avg. = Batting average; HR = Home runs; RBI = Runs batted in; SB = Stolen bases

Pitching

Starting pitchers 
Note: G = Games pitched; IP = Innings pitched; W = Wins; L = Losses; ERA = Earned run average; BB = Bases on balls; SO = Strikeouts; CG = Complete games

Other pitchers 
Note: G = Games pitched; IP = Innings pitched; W = Wins; L = Losses; ERA = Earned run average; BB = Bases on balls; SO = Strikeouts; CG = Complete games

Relief pitchers 
Note: G = Games pitched; IP = Innings pitched; W = Wins; L = Losses; SV = Saves; ERA = Earned run average; BB = Bases on balls; SO = Strikeouts

Awards and honors

League top ten finishers 
Burleigh Grimes
 #2 in NL in strikeouts (131)
 #3 in NL in wins (23)
 #3 in NL in ERA (2.22)

Zack Wheat
 #4 in NL in batting average (.328)
 #4 in NL in on-base percentage (.385)

1920 World Series 

On October 10, 1920, which was the fifth game of the World Series, Elmer Smith of the Indians hit the first grand slam in World Series history. On the same day, Bill Wambsganss of the Indians had an unassisted triple play. He caught a liner, touched second base, and tagged the runner coming from first base. During that same game, Indians pitcher Jim Bagby became the first pitcher to hit a home run in World Series history.

Game 1 
October 5, 1920, at Ebbets Field in Brooklyn, New York

Game 2 
October 6, 1920, at Ebbets Field in Brooklyn, New York

Game 3 
October 7, 1920, at Ebbets Field in Brooklyn, New York

Game 4 
October 9, 1920, at Dunn Field in Cleveland, Ohio

Game 5 
October 10, 1920, at Dunn Field in Cleveland, Ohio

Game 6 
October 11, 1920, at Dunn Field in Cleveland, Ohio

Game 7 
October 12, 1920, at Dunn Field in Cleveland, Ohio

References

External links 
Baseball-Reference season page
Baseball Almanac season page
1920 Brooklyn Robins uniform
Brooklyn Dodgers reference site
Acme Dodgers page 
Retrosheet

Los Angeles Dodgers seasons
Brooklyn Robins season
National League champion seasons
Brooklyn Robins season
1920s in Brooklyn
Flatbush, Brooklyn